Raymond Cooper (born 19 September 1947) is an English musician who has worked as a session and road-tour percussionist. During his career, Cooper has worked and toured with numerous musically diverse bands and artists including Elton John (as a duo and as a member of his band), Billy Joel, George Harrison, Paul McCartney, Ringo Starr, Pink Floyd, The Rolling Stones, Eric Clapton, Mark Knopfler, David Gilmour, Roger Waters and Art Garfunkel. Cooper absorbed the influence of rock drummers from the 1960s and 1970s such as Ginger Baker, Carmine Appice and John Bonham.

Incorporation of unusual instruments for rock drummers of the time such as cowbells, glockenspiel and tubular bells, along with several standard kit elements, helped create a highly varied setup. Continually modified to this day, Cooper's percussion set offers a large array of percussion instruments for sonic diversity such as the tambourine, congas, crash cymbals, cowbells, rototoms, tubular bells, the gong, snare drum and timpani.

Cooper is known to have played tambourine, congas, maracas, bongos, cymbals, wind chimes, bell tree, triangle, timpani, bells, tubular bells, shaker, vibraphone, marimba, gong, Rototoms, jaw bone, cowbell, finger cymbals, timbales, crotales, güiro, glockenspiel, whistle, drum kit, snare drum, keyboards, piano and guitar.

Life and career

Cooper was born in Watford, Hertfordshire. In addition to percussion, Cooper studied classical piano, strings and woodwind, as well as theatre. He later joined the band Blue Mink, and as a session musician he played on records for artists such as America, Carly Simon and David Essex. He played on and co-produced the album Somewhere in England by George Harrison in 1981.

Cooper has long been associated with Elton John's career, playing on more than 90 recordings, and performing in more than 800 concerts with John both as a duo and in the Elton John Band. His first appearance with John was during the sessions for Madman Across the Water, and he played his first live show with him in early 1972. Cooper had a short stint with The Rolling Stones playing percussion for their 1974 It's Only Rock 'n Roll album. After contributing to various Elton John albums, Cooper joined the Elton John Band full-time in 1974 and spent the next two years recording and touring with the group.

During John's semi-retirement in the late 1970s, Cooper played on various singles and albums for John, and recorded with George Harrison, the Kinks, Wings and Art Garfunkel. In 1977 and again in 1979, Cooper toured with Elton John as a duo in which John would play a solo set and then be joined by Cooper on percussion for the second half of the concerts.

Cooper's relationship with the Rolling Stones continued into the 1980s. In 1981, he contributed to Bill Wyman's third solo album. In 1983, he participated in a short tour for the Ronnie Lane ARMS Charity Concert along with Eric Clapton, Jimmy Page, Jeff Beck and other artists, including Bill Wyman and Charlie Watts.

In the 1980s, Cooper continued to record and tour periodically with Elton John. In 1986, he joined John's touring band for the Tour De Force (tour) concerts in Australia with the Melbourne Symphony Orchestra, augmenting Jody Linscott, who was the band's percussionist on the rest of John's world tour.

Cooper showed up on Christine McVie's self-titled solo album in 1984. In 1985, Cooper appeared on both Mick Jagger's She's the Boss album and Bill Wyman's Willie & The Poor Boys. Also in 1985, Cooper performed as percussionist for a number of artists during the charity event Live Aid. In 1997, he guested with Bill Wyman's Rhythm Kings for Struttin' Our Stuff.

In every tour during 1990, Eric Clapton and the band played "Sunshine of Your Love", which then flowed into a short one-minute drum solo by Steve Ferrone (drummer for Clapton's band on the tour), then into a seven-minute percussion solo by Cooper on the tambourine, congas and gong. On 16 January 1992, he played percussion for Clapton's instalment of the MTV Unplugged television series.

During 1994 and 1995 Face to Face tours with Billy Joel, and during Elton John's tours in 1995, Elton John played "Saturday Night's Alright for Fighting", which then flowed into a solo by Cooper on percussion. In the 1995 "Evening With Elton John and Ray Cooper" tour, the two men performed in Argentina, Brazil, Colombia, Venezuela and Costa Rica, where John performed a solo set, then was joined by Cooper on percussion for the second half of the show. On 15 September 1997, Cooper was the principal percussionist along with Phil Collins at the Music for Montserrat fund raiser concert in Royal Albert Hall. Cooper was part of the band at the Concert for George, the memorial concert for George Harrison, held at the Royal Albert Hall in 2002. He contributed to the tribute concert for Jim Capaldi in January 2007. He worked on Katie Melua's album Pictures (2007).

Film work 
Towards the end of the 1980s, Cooper got involved in film as a musician, actor and producer. His work in film production included work for HandMade Films, which was owned by his friend George Harrison.

Cooper has played small roles such as the preacher in Robert Altman's feature film Popeye (1980) starring Robin Williams and Shelley Duvall. He has performed music in several of Terry Gilliam's productions, appearing on-screen in quirky roles like the technician who swats the beetle at the beginning of Gilliam's 1985 film Brazil and as the functionary whispering in the ear of Jonathan Pryce's Right Ordinary Horatio Jackson character in 1989's The Adventures of Baron Munchausen. He appeared in the Concert for Cascara in the 1985 film Water, and appears as a street commercial for The Zero Theorem.

Recent work
Cooper has continued recording and performing with Elton John on various albums and tours, including John's The Million Dollar Piano show in Las Vegas. In 2009, John and Cooper performed a small exclusive series of shows, mostly in the UK and Europe, the first time since 1995 that the two had toured together without a band. Amongst their performances was one at the Royal Albert Hall to raise funds for a new organ which the Royal Academy of Music would assemble in their Duke's Hall. They raised further funds with a further performance at the Royal Opera House in 2011. The organ has been named the Sir Elton John and Ray Cooper Organ, and was heard for the first time on 7 October 2013. In a greeting to Cooper on his 70th birthday, John's website stated that when Elton composed the song "Tambourine" for his 2016 Wonderful Crazy Night album, he made sure to bring in Cooper to play the instrument on the track. As of June 2019, Cooper is touring with John as part of his Farewell Yellow Brick Road farewell tour.

Discography 
With Elton John
 Madman Across the Water (Uni Records, 1971)
 Honky Château (Uni Records, 1972)
 Goodbye Yellow Brick Road (MCA Records, 1973)
 Caribou (MCA Records, 1974)
 Captain Fantastic and the Brown Dirt Cowboy (MCA Records, 1975)
 Rock of the Westies (MCA Records, 1975)
 Blue Moves (Rocket, 1976)
 A Single Man (Rocket Records, 1978)
 Too Low for Zero (Geffen, 1983)
 Reg Strikes Back (MCA Records, 1988)
 Made in England (Island Records, 1995)
 Wonderful Crazy Night (Mercury Records, 2016)

With Joan Armatrading
 Whatever's for Us (A&M Records, 1972)
 Walk Under Ladders (A&M Records, 1981)
 Sleight of Hand (A&M Records, 1986)

With Pink Floyd
 The Final Cut (Harvest Records, 1983)

With Roger Waters
 The Pros and Cons of Hitch Hiking (Columbia Records, 1984)

With America
 America (Warner Bros. Records, 1971)

With David Gilmour
 About Face (Columbia Records, 1984)

With Murray Head
 Nigel Lived (CBS Records, 1972)

With Ian Dury
 Laughter (Stiff Records, 1980)
 4,000 Weeks' Holiday (Polydor Records, 1984)
 Apples (WEA Records, 1989)
 The Bus Driver's Prayer & Other Stories (Demon Records, 1992)

With Colin Blunstone
 Planes (Epic Records, 1976)
 Never Even Thought (Epic Records, 1978)

With Katie Melua
 Pictures (Dramatico, 2007)

With George Harrison
 George Harrison (Dark Horse Records, 1979)
 Somewhere in England (Dark Horse Records, 1981)
 Gone Troppo (Dark Horse Records, 1982)
 Cloud Nine (Dark Horse Records, 1987)
 Brainwashed (Dark Horse Records, 2002)

With David Essex
 Rock On (Columbia Records, 1973)
 David Essex (CBS Records, 1974)
 Imperial Wizard (Mercury Records, 1978)
 Stage - Struck (Metronome Records, 1982)
 The Whisper (Mercury Records, 1983)

With Carly Simon
 No Secrets (Elektra Records, 1972)

With Kiki Dee
 Kiki Dee (Rocket, 1977)

With Cliff Richard
 Silver (EMI, 1983)

With Christine McVie
 Christine McVie (Warner Bros. Records, 1984)

With Chris Rea
 Chris Rea (Magnet Records, 1981)

With Roy Orbison
 Mystery Girl (Virgin Records, 1989)

With Art Garfunkel
 Fate for Breakfast (Columbia Records, 1979)
 Scissors Cut (Columbia Records, 1981)

With Cass Elliot
 The Road Is No Place for a Lady (RCA Records, 1972)

With Roger Chapman
 Chappo (Arista Records, 1979)

With Mick Jagger
 She's the Boss (Columbia Records, 1985)

With Nigel Olsson
 Nigel Olsson (The Rocket Record Company, 1975)
 Nigel Olsson (Columbia Records, 1978)
 Nigel (Bang Records, 1979)

With Dana Gillespie
 Weren't Born a Man (MCA Records, 1973)

With Eric Clapton
 Behind the Sun (Warner Bros. Records, 1985)

With Rick Wakeman
 The Six Wives of Henry VIII (A&M Records, 1973)

With Sting
 The Soul Cages (A&M Records, 1991)

With Bryan Ferry
 In Your Mind (EG Records, 1977)

With Yvonne Elliman
 Food of Love (Purple Records, 1973)

With Paul McCartney
 Press to Play (Parlophone, 1986)

With Rosemary Clooney
 Nice to Be Around (United Artists Records, 1977)

With Bill Wyman
 Stuff (Victor Records, 1992)

With Bill Quateman
 Bill Quateman (Columbia Records, 1973)

With Rod Stewart
 Smiler (Mercury Records, 1974)

With Harry Nilsson
 Son of Schmilsson (RCA Records, 1972)

With Lulu
 Don't Take Love for Granted (The Rocket Record Company, 1979)
 Lulu (Alfa Records, 1981)

With Donovan
 Essence to Essence (Epic Records, 1973)

With Madeline Bell
 This is One Girl (Pye Records, 1976)

With Ringo Starr
 Stop and Smell the Roses (RCA Records, 1981)
 Old Wave (RCA Records, 1983)

References

External links

1947 births
English session musicians
Grammy Award winners
Living people
People from Watford
Blue Mink members
Musicians from Hertfordshire
English drummers
British male drummers
British percussionists
Elton John Band members